Canoeing at the 2012 Summer Olympics in London were contested in two main disciplines: canoe slalom, from 29 July to 2 August, and canoe sprint, from 6 to 11 August. The slalom competition was held at the Lee Valley White Water Centre and the sprint events were staged at Eton College Rowing Centre, at Dorney Lake, known as Eton Dorney.

Around 330 athletes took part in 16 events. The men's 500m sprints were replaced by a 200m race; in addition, the men's C-2 500m was replaced by a women's K-1 200m sprint. This was confirmed at an International Canoe Federation board meeting at Windsor, Berkshire, on 5 December 2009. For the first time, women competed in two individual events in sprint canoeing. Because of the changes, the finals were spread over a three-day period instead of the traditional two days which had been in effect since the 1976 Games.
The most successful nation in the slalom was France, with two gold medals in the four events, followed by Great Britain with one gold and one silver. In the sprint, Hungary was the most successful with three gold, two silver and one bronze medal, while Germany topped the medal table overall, with three gold, two silver and three bronze medals.

Qualification

A new qualification system was created for both slalom and sprint canoeing at the 2012 Games. The quotas were set for each event by the International Canoe Federation in July 2010.

Competition schedule

Medal summary

By event

Slalom

Sprint
Men

Women

  On 12 June 2019, the IOC stripped Lithuanian canoeist Jevgenij Shuklin of his silver medal.

Gallery

Gallery of some of the gold medalists in the canoeing events:

By nation

References

External links 

 
 
 
 
 

 
2012 Summer Olympics events
2012
Olympics
Canoeing and kayaking competitions in the United Kingdom